Kyle Van Noy (born March 26, 1991) is an American football linebacker for the Los Angeles Chargers of the National Football League (NFL). Van Noy played college football at BYU was selected in the second round of the 2014 NFL Draft by the Detroit Lions, with whom he spent his first three seasons. He played his next four seasons for the New England Patriots, where he won Super Bowl LI and Super Bowl LIII. Following a year as a member of the Miami Dolphins, he rejoined New England in 2021. Van Noy signed with the Chargers the following season.

Early years
Van Noy was born in Reno, Nevada and was partially raised in Lodi, California. He attended McQueen High School in Reno where, as an all-state linebacker and receiver, he led his high school football team to a perfect 14–0 record and a 4A state championship in 2008, and was rated as a 2-star recruit by Rivals.com and Scout.com.

In addition to playing football, Van Noy lettered in basketball, baseball, and track where he was an all-league performer (4 × 100 m, 4 × 200 m and 4 × 400 m). He also ran the 100 meters in 11.84 seconds and the 400 meters in 50.99 seconds.

Van Noy was ranked the 63rd best high school athlete by ESPN. He received scholarship offers from Arizona, Arizona State University, Boise State University, BYU, California, University of Colorado, UCLA, UNLV, Nevada, San Jose State University, and Stanford.

College career

Freshman season (2010)
Van Noy was admitted to BYU in 2009 but sat out his first year due to an honor code violation. During the 2010 season, he played in every game while starting two and earned letterman honors.  He recorded 35 tackles (24 solo) and was third on the team with 7.5 tackles-for-loss including 2.0 sacks.  He also recorded two forced fumbles, two quarterback hurries, two pass breakups and one fumble recovery (which he returned 44 yards for a touchdown).

Sophomore season (2011)
Van Noy started eight and played in all 13 games of the 2011 season, recording 68 tackles and leading the team with 15 tackles for loss, 7 sacks, 10 quarterback hurries and tied for the team lead with three interceptions.  During the 2011 season, Van Noy was the only FBS Division I player to record a stat in each of the following categories: tackle, tackle for loss, sack, interception, pass breakup, quarterback hurry, fumble recovery, forced fumble, blocked kick and touchdown.  Like the 2010 season, he again recovered a fumble (which he forced), which he returned for the game-winning touchdown.

He was named to the Phil Steele All-Independent First-team, Yahoo! Sports All-Independent Team and FBS All-Independent Team.

Junior season (2012)

In 2012, Van Noy was the defensive leader of a BYU team that led the nation in red zone defense (opponent red zone percentage of .62), was second in rushing defense (84.25 yards/game), third in 3rd down conversion percentage (27.71%) and total defense (allowing 26.33 yards/game), fourth in 1st down defense (14.83/game), and fifth in scoring defense (176 total points).  Additionally, they were in the top 25 in passing defense (13th), sacks (22nd), 4th down conversion defense (23rd), and tackles for loss (25th).

In 13 games played he recorded 53 tackles, 22 tackles-for-loss, 13 sacks, 2 interceptions (one for a touchdown), 6 forced fumbles, and 1 fumble recovered (for a touchdown), 8 quarterback hurries, 5 pass break-ups, and 2 blocked kicks. Van Noy dominated in BYU's 23–6 victory over San Diego State in the 2012 San Diego County Credit Union Poinsettia Bowl, where he recorded 8 tackles, 1.5 sacks, 1 forced fumble, 1 fumble recovery (for a touchdown), 1 interception (for a touchdown), and a blocked punt. One writer speculated that Van Noy's performance, in a bowl, may be the best defensive performance by a BYU Cougar ever.

Van Noy was named to the Bronko Nagurski Trophy, Lombardi Award and Chuck Bednarik Award Watch Lists, was National Linebacker of week 3, and was third team All-American.

Van Noy was projected as a first or second round pick in the 2013 NFL Draft, but opted to remain at BYU for his senior season.

Senior season (2013)
As a senior in 2013, Van Noy was named to the watch lists for the Butkus Award, Rotary Lombardi, Bronko Nagurski Trophy, Walter Camp, Chuck Bednarik Award, and the Lott Trophy.  He was a Phil Steele, USA Today, and SI.com Preseason All-American and finished the season All-America to Walter Camp Second-team, Athlon Sports Third-team, CBSSports.com Third-team and Sport and SI.com Honorable Mention. He was also named to the All-Independent first-team and was the All-Independent Defensive Player of the Year. In his final collegiate season, he recorded 70 total tackles, 17 tackles-for-loss, four sacks, two interceptions, six passes defended, and two fumble recoveries.

College career statistics

Professional career
On December 16, 2013, it was announced that Van Noy had accepted his invitation to the Senior Bowl. On January 25, 2014, Van Noy played in the 2014 Senior Bowl and recorded two solo tackles and one sack as part of Jacksonville Jaguars' head coach Gus Bradley's South team that defeated the North 20–10. His Senior Bowl performance helped solidify his status as a top outside linebacker in the draft. He was also ranked as the top outside linebacker in the Senior Bowl by the Reese's Senior Bowl Executive Director Phil Savage. Van Noy attended the NFL Scouting Combine in Indianapolis and completed all of the combine drills. 

On March 14, 2014, Van Noy participated at BYU's pro day, but chose to stand on his combine numbers and only performed positional drills. Van Noy attended pre-draft visits with multiple teams, including the Atlanta Falcons, Baltimore Ravens, Detroit Lions, and Jacksonville Jaguars. At the conclusion of the pre-draft process, Van Noy was projected to be a second round pick by NFL draft experts and scouts. He was ranked as the fourth best outside linebacker prospect in the draft by CBS Sports and was ranked as the fifth best outside linebacker by DraftScout.com and NFL analyst Mike Mayock. Van Noy was also ranked as the fifth best linebacker by Sports Illustrated.

Detroit Lions
The Detroit Lions selected Van Noy in the second round (40th overall) of the 2014 NFL Draft. The Lions traded their second (45th overall), fourth (111th overall), and seventh round (227th overall) picks to the Seattle Seahawks in exchange for a fifth round pick (146th overall) and a second round pick (40th overall) that was used to draft Van Noy. Van Noy was the sixth linebacker drafted in 2014.

2014
On June 4, 2014, the Detroit Lions signed Van Noy to a four-year, $5.10 million rookie contract with $2.63 million guaranteed and a $2.03 million signing bonus.

Throughout training camp, Van Noy competed against Ashlee Palmer to be the starting strongside linebacker. On August 25, 2014, it was reported that Van Noy had noticed an abdominal injury five days prior and would miss the next four to six weeks. On August 28, 2014, the Lions announced that Van Noy had successfully undergone muscle core surgery, but offered no timetable on his return.

On November 9, 2014, Van Noy made his professional regular season debut and registered two solo tackles during a 20–16 victory against the Miami Dolphins in Week 10. Van Noy completed his rookie season in 2014 with six solo tackles while appearing in eight games with zero starts. The Lions finished second in the NFC North with an 11–5 record and earned a wildcard playoff berth. On January 4, 2015, Van Noy appeared in his first career playoff game as the Lions lost 24–20 at the Dallas Cowboys during the NFC Wildcard Game.

2015
During training camp, Van Noy competed against Tahir Whitehead to be the starting strongside linebacker. Head coach Jim Caldwell named Van Noy the backup strongside linebacker, behind Tahir Whitehead, to start the regular season. Van Noy was inactive as a healthy scratch for the Lions' Week 5 loss to the Arizona Cardinals due to the return of DeAndre Levy. On October 25, 2015, Van Noy recorded two solo tackles and made his first career sack during the Lions' 28–19 loss to the Minnesota Vikings in Week 7. Van Noy sacked Vikings' quarterback Teddy Bridgewater for a one-yard loss during the first quarter. In Week 12, he collected a season-high three solo tackles during a 45–14 win against the Philadelphia Eagles. He finished the 2015 NFL season with ten combined tackles (eight solo) and one sack in 16 games and one start.

2016
Throughout training camp, Van Noy competed against Jon Bostic and Josh Bynes for job as a starting linebacker. Head coach Jim Caldwell named Van Noy the starting strongside linebacker to begin the regular season. He started the season alongside DeAndre Levy and middle linebacker Tahir Whitehead.

He made his first career start in the Lions' season-opener at the Indianapolis Colts and deflected one pass during their 39–35 victory. In Week 4, he collected a season-high seven solo tackles during a 17–14 loss at the Chicago Bears. Before being traded, Van Noy started the first seven games of the season for the Lions and registered 23 total tackles. He finished his time with the Lions with a total of 39 tackles since 2014.

New England Patriots

2016 
On October 25, 2016, the Detroit Lions traded Van Noy and a seventh round pick (239th overall) in the 2017 NFL Draft to the New England Patriots in exchange for a sixth round pick (215th overall) in 2017. Van Noy was inactive for his first two games with the Patriots (Weeks 8 and 10), and served as the backup weakside linebacker, behind Shea McClellin.

On November 20, 2016, Van Noy played in his first game as a member of the Patriots and recorded three combined tackles and one sack during their 30–17 win at the San Francisco 49ers in Week 11. On December 4, 2016, Van Noy recorded five combined tackles, broke up a pass, and made his first career interception during a 26–10 win against the Los Angeles Rams. Van Noy intercepted a pass by Rams' rookie quarterback Jared Goff during the third quarter after the play was disrupted by Jabaal Sheard. He appeared in seven games for the Patriots in 2016 and recorded 29 combined tackles (11 solo), two pass deflections, one sack, and one interception. In total, Van Noy finished the season with 52 combined tackles (32 solo), three pass deflections, one sack, and one interception in 14 games and nine starts.

The Patriots finished first in the AFC East with a 14–2 record and earned a first round bye in the playoffs. The Patriots defeated the Houston Texans 34–16 in the AFC Divisional Round. On January 22, 2017, Van Noy recorded four solo tackles during a 36–17 win against the Pittsburgh Steelers in the AFC Championship Game. On February 5, 2017, Van Noy appeared in Super Bowl LI and made one tackle and was credited with half a sack during the Patriots' 34–28 overtime victory against the Atlanta Falcons. The Patriots came back from a 25-point deficit in the third quarter to defeat the Falcons and earn Van Noy the first Super Bowl victory of his career.

2017
During training camp, Van Noy competed to be a starting outside linebacker against David Harris, Elandon Roberts, and Shea McClellin. Van Noy was the starting strongside linebacker to begin the regular season. He started alongside Elandon Roberts and middle linebacker Dont'a Hightower. On September 8, 2017, the Patriots signed Van Noy to a two-year, $11.75 million contract that includes $5.50 million guaranteed and a signing bonus of $3.50 million.  

In Week 3, he collected a season-high 11 combined tackles (nine solo) during a 36–33 win against the Houston Texans. On October 15, 2017, Van Noy recorded seven combined tackles and made a season-high two sacks during a 24–17 victory at the New York Jets in Week 7. He sustained a calf injury and was inactive for three games (Weeks 14–16). Van Noy finished the 2017 NFL season with 73 combined tackles (58 solo), 5.5 sacks, and two pass deflections in 13 games and 12 starts.

The Patriots finished atop their division with a 13–3 record and earned a first round bye in the playoffs. The Patriots defeated the Tennessee Titans 35–14 in the AFC Divisional Round. On January 21, 2018, Van Noy made nine combined tackles, a pass deflection, and made one sack as the Patriots defeated the Jacksonville Jaguars 24–20 in the AFC Championship Game. On February 4, 2018, Van Noy started in Super Bowl LII and made five combined tackles as the Patriots lost 41–33 to the Philadelphia Eagles.

2018
Then-linebackers coach Brian Flores took over duties as defensive coordinator after Matt Patricia accepted the head coaching position with the Detroit Lions. He named Van Noy and Dont'a Hightower the starting linebackers to begin the regular season as the Patriots continued to use a base defense that deployed only two linebackers.

On October 21, 2018, Van Noy registered six solo tackles and scored his first career touchdown after returning a blocked punt during the Patriots 38–31 victory at the Chicago Bears in Week 7. During the third quarter, teammate Dont'a Hightower blocked a punt attempt by Bears' punter Pat O'Donnell that was recovered by Van Noy and returned 29 yards for a touchdown. In Week 10, he collected a season-high 12 combined tackles (five solo) during the Patriots' 34–10 loss at the Tennessee Titans. Against the New York Jets on December 30, 2018, Van Noy scored his second career touchdown after recovering a fumble forced by teammate Adam Butler. On January 13, 2019, the Patriots defeated the Chargers in the AFC Divisional Round of the playoffs to move on to the AFC Championship Game. Van Noy recorded 4 tackles in the win. On January 20, 2019, the Patriots defeated the Kansas City Chiefs in the AFC Championship Game in overtime. In the game, Van Noy recorded 10 tackles, 2 sacks, and a forced fumble. The win advanced the Patriots to their third straight Super Bowl. In Super Bowl LIII, Van Noy recorded 3 tackles, a sack, and a tackle for loss in the Patriots' 13–3 victory over the Los Angeles Rams. The 3 points allowed by the Patriots defense were tied for the fewest ever in a Super Bowl.

2019
In Week 4 against the Buffalo Bills, Van Noy recorded a team high 8 tackles, 2 sacks on Josh Allen, and forced 2 fumbles in the 16–10 win. He was named AFC Defensive Player of the Week for his efforts. 
In week 6 against the New York Giants, Van Noy recorded a sack on rookie quarterback Daniel Jones and recovered a fumble forced by teammate Jamie Collins on Jon Hilliman and returned the ball for a 20-yard touchdown in the 35–14 win. In week 7 against the New York Jets, Van Noy recovered a fumble by Jets quarterback Sam Darnold forced by teammate John Simon in the 33–0 win.
In week 9 against the Baltimore Ravens, Van Noy forced a fumble on running back Mark Ingram II that was recovered by teammate Lawrence Guy in the 37–20 loss.

Miami Dolphins
On March 21, 2020, the Miami Dolphins signed Van Noy to a four-year, $51 million contract that included $30 million guaranteed and a signing bonus of $12 million. The signing reunited Van Noy with Dolphins head coach Brian Flores, who was the linebackers coach in New England from 2016 to 2018. He was also reunited with former Patriots' linebackers Kamu Grugier-Hill and Elandon Roberts.

Van Noy made his debut with the Dolphins in Week 1 against his former team, the New England Patriots.  During the game, Van Noy sacked quarterback Cam Newton once in the 21–11 loss. In Week 3 against the Jacksonville Jaguars on Thursday Night Football, Van Noy recorded a strip sack and later recovered the football during the 31–13 win.  In Week 13, Van Noy recorded eight tackles, five for loss, and three sacks in a 19–7 win over the Cincinnati Bengals.  His efforts earned him AFC Defensive Player of the Week honors. He was placed on the reserve/COVID-19 list by the team on November 12, 2020, and was activated two days later.

Van Noy was released by the Dolphins after one season on March 10, 2021.

New England Patriots (second stint)
On March 19, 2021, the Patriots signed Van Noy to a two-year deal worth up to $13.2 million. While he was productive in his second stint in New England, the Patriots were tight on cap space so they released Van Noy on March 7, 2022.

Los Angeles Chargers
On May 5, 2022, Van Noy signed with the Los Angeles Chargers.

NFL career statistics

Regular season

Personal life
Van Noy was college roommates and a mentor to football player and former Lions teammate Ziggy Ansah, and best friends with former BYU basketball player Brandon Davies.

Van Noy proposed to on-again, off-again girlfriend the former Miss Utah USA winner, Marissa Powell in December 2013.  They were married in 2014. Both are members of the Church of Jesus Christ of Latter-day Saints. They have a son Trae Legend, and a daughter Giavanna Monnae.

References

External links
 BYU Cougars bio

1991 births
Living people
American football linebackers
BYU Cougars football players
Detroit Lions players
Los Angeles Chargers players
Miami Dolphins players
New England Patriots players
Players of American football from Nevada
Sportspeople from Reno, Nevada